A Warning to the Curious is a 1972 supernatural drama produced by the BBC as the second instalment of its A Ghost Story for Christmas strand. As with the previous instalment, The Stalls of Barchester (1971), it was adapted and directed by Lawrence Gordon Clark and was first broadcast on BBC 1 at 11pm on Christmas Eve 1972. Running at 50 minutes, the drama was based on "A Warning to the Curious", a ghost story by British writer M. R. James, included in his book A Warning to the Curious and Other Ghost Stories first published in 1925.

Synopsis

In the 1930s the recently made unemployed Paxton (Peter Vaughan), an amateur archaeologist who has fallen on hard times during the Great Depression, travels to a remote seaside town in Norfolk to search for one of the three lost crowns of East Anglia, which, according to legend, protect the East Anglian coast from invasion. Paxton tracks down the location of the buried crown by discovering that the local Ager family have been the guardians of the crown and its burial site for generations. The last of the family was William Ager (John Kearney), who had died a few years previously. Upon unearthing the crown, Paxton is stalked by its supernatural guardian.

Realising the danger he is in, Paxton, with the assistance of his fellow hotel guest Dr Black (Clive Swift), reburies the crown in an attempt to appease the wrathful guardian spirit that watches over it; but the two men greatly underestimate the punishment that awaits those who are curious enough to dig for the crown.

Adaptation

In adapting the story, Clark changed the protagonist of the original from a young, innocent amateur who discovers the crown by accident to a middle-aged man (Peter Vaughan) who travels to Seaburgh specifically to find the crown. The era is updated to the 1930s, the background of the Depression adding an extra layer to Paxton's search for the treasure. The narrative layering of the original James story is dispensed with and a chronological narrative is used instead. Clark noted in a 2014 interview that he tried to make A Warning to the Curious as "essentially, a silent film, with the tension building slowly throughout the visual images".

Clark also included the character of Dr. Black (Clive Swift), who first appeared in The Stalls of Barchester.

Cast
Peter Vaughan .. Mr Paxton
Clive Swift .. Dr. Black
Julian Herington .. Archaeologist
John Kearney .. Ager/The Guardian
David Cargill .. Boots
George Benson .. Vicar
Roger Milner .. antique shop owner 
Gilly Fraser .. girl at cottage 
David Pugh .. station porter 
Cyril Appleton .. labourer

Locations

For A Warning to the Curious, "Seaburgh" (a disguised version of Aldeburgh, Suffolk) was filmed on the coast of North Norfolk at Waxham, Holkham Beach and Holkham Wood at Holkham Gap, Happisburgh, Wells-next-the-Sea and on the North Norfolk Railway. Clark recalls filming in North Norfolk in late February, with consistently fine cold weather "with a slight winter haze which gave exactly the right depth and sense of mystery to the limitless vistas of the shoreline there."

References

External links

Adaptations of works by M. R. James
BBC television dramas
Television shows based on short fiction
A Ghost Story for Christmas
1972 television films